José Manuel Quiroga (born February 18, 1986 in Buenos Aires, Argentina) is an Argentine footballer currently playing for Gimnasia y Esgrima of the Torneo Argentino A in Argentina.

Teams
  Defensores de Belgrano 2006-2007
  Sarmiento de Junín 2008
  Boca de Río Gallegos 2009-2011
  Gimnasia y Tiro de Salta 2011
  Deportivo Madryn 2012-2013
  Curicó Unido 2013
  Sportivo Las Parejas 2014-2015
  Gimnasia y Esgrima 2015–

References
 
 

1986 births
Living people
Argentine footballers
Argentine expatriate footballers
Gimnasia y Tiro footballers
Defensores de Belgrano footballers
Club Atlético Sarmiento footballers
Curicó Unido footballers
Primera B de Chile players
Expatriate footballers in Chile
Association football forwards
Footballers from Buenos Aires